Miss DuPont (born Patricia Hannon; April 28, 1894 – February 6, 1973) was an American film actress and fashion designer.

Biography
Sometimes credited as Patty DuPont, Miss DuPont was born as Patricia Hannon in Frankfort, Kentucky, though sources sometimes state her place of birth as Frankfort, Indiana. She appeared as a wealthy and naive American woman seduced by Erich von Stroheim's odious count in Foolish Wives (1922). Although Stroheim is credited with discovering her, she had already made several films beginning in 1919 with The Day She Paid.

She was the second wife of Sylvanus Stokes. They met while he was traveling in Los Angeles shortly after his 1926 divorce from his first wife, Margaret Fahnestock Stokes, and were married in January, 1928. She was living on Via Linda in Palm Beach, Florida, near the Palm Beach Country Club, in 1958. Miss Dupont died in Palm Beach in 1973.

Filmography

Lombardi, Ltd. (1919)
 The Day She Paid (1919)
Bonnie May (1920)
 The Rage of Paris (1921)
Prisoners of Love (1921)
 False Kisses (1921)
Foolish Wives (1922)
The Golden Gallows (1922) *unknown/presumably lost
A Wonderful Wife (1922)
 Shattered Dreams (1922)
Brass (1923)
 The Broken Wing (1923)
The Common Law (1923) *lost film
The Man from Brodney's (1923) *incomplete
 What Three Men Wanted (1924)
So This Is Marriage? (1924) *lost film
One Night in Rome (1924)
Sinners in Silk (1924) *lost film
Raffles, the Amateur Cracksman (1925)
 Three Keys (1925)
 Accused (1925)
 Defend Yourself (1925)
A Slave of Fashion (1925) *lost film
Good and Naughty (1926) *lost film
Mantrap (1926)
That Model from Paris (1926)
Hula (1927)
The Wheel of Destiny  (1927)

References

External links

American silent film actresses
Actresses from Kentucky
Actresses from Indiana
People from Frankfort, Kentucky
1894 births
1973 deaths
20th-century American actresses